Kassaki Kalan is a union council of Abbottabad District in Khyber-Pakhtunkhwa province of Pakistan. According to the 2017 Census of Pakistan, the population is 12,434.

Subdivisions
 Baghati
 Bain Gojri
 Bain Noora
 Banseri
 Bhoraj
 Botiala
 Darobarh
 Jatal
 Kassaki Kalan
 Kassaki Khurd
 Mehal
 Thana

References

Union councils of Abbottabad District